s-index may refer to:

 S-index, a spectroscopic measure of chromospheric activity on other stars 
 s-index, an author-level metric